Van Natta or VanNatta is a surname. Notable people with the surname include:

Bruce H. Van Natta, American engineer and IMSAI co-founder
Don Van Natta, Jr. (born 1964), American writer
Jamie Van Natta (born 1978), American archer
Owen Van Natta, American businessman

See also
Van Etten
Van Atta

Surnames of Dutch origin